The Bozhou rebellion was a Miao uprising that occurred in Guizhou and spread to Sichuan and Huguang between 1589 and 1600 during the Ming dynasty.

Events 
In 1589, the Bozhou Tusi region (Zunyi, Guizhou) erupted into inter-tribal warfare between seven tusi chiefdoms. The war coalesced into a full scale rebellion with one of the tusi chieftains, Yang Yinglong, at its head, and spread to Sichuan and Huguang where they engaged in widespread looting and destruction.

In 1593 the Wanli Emperor offered Yang Yinglong amnesty if he led his army in the war effort against the Japanese invasion of Joseon. Yang Yinglong agreed to the proposition and was half way to Korea before the Japanese withdrew (only to attack again the following year). Yang returned to Guizhou where Sichuan's grand coordinator Wang Jiguang called for him to stand trial in court. Yang did not comply and in 1594 local Ming forces attempted to quell the situation but were defeated in battle.

By 1598 Yang's rebel army had swelled to a size of 140,000 and the Ming government was forced to mobilize an army of 200,000 with troops from various regions. The Ming army attacked the rebels from eight directions. Li Hualong, Liu Ting, Ma Liying, Wu Guang, Cao Xibin, Tong Yuanzhen, Zhu Heling, Li Yingxiang, and Chen Lin converged on Yang Yinglong's stronghold on Lou Mountain (Bozhou District) and quickly captured it, forcing the rebels to flee northwest. Anti-rebel suppression lasted three more months. After Yang Yinglong's general Yang Zhu died in battle, he committed suicide by self-immolation, ending the rebellion. His family was transported to Beijing where they were executed. The Bozhou tusi was abolished and its territory was reorganized into Zunyi and Pingyue prefectures. Expenditures for the Ming campaign was 1.5 million silver taels in total.

References

Bibliography
 
 
 .

16th century in China
Rebellions in the Ming dynasty
16th-century rebellions
Miao people